The 1994–95 NBA season was the 49th season of the National Basketball Association. The season ended with the Houston Rockets defeating the Orlando Magic 4 games to 0 in the NBA Finals to be crowned champions.

Notable occurrences

The Houston Rockets became the lowest seeded team to ever win the NBA Finals, winning as the sixth seed in the Western Conference. The Rockets also became the first team to defeat four opponents who had 50 or more wins en route to a title (Utah, Phoenix, San Antonio and Orlando); the only other team ever to accomplish that feat was the 2000–01 Los Angeles Lakers.
The 1995 NBA All-Star Game was played at America West Arena (now known as Footprint Center) in Phoenix, Arizona, with the West defeating the East 139–112. Mitch Richmond of the Sacramento Kings was named the game's MVP (Most Valuable Player).
Late in the season, Michael Jordan returned to the Chicago Bulls after an attempt at a minor-league baseball career. His announcement consisted of a two-word fax: "I'm back." Because the Bulls had already retired his number 23, he returned wearing number 45. However, he changed back to 23 during the playoffs.
An era came to an end as the Boston Celtics played their final season at the historic Boston Garden.
The Portland Trail Blazers played their final season at Memorial Coliseum (renamed as the Veterans Memorial Coliseum as of 2012). They would host a preseason game at the Coliseum in 2009.
The Boston Celtics played their final season at Boston Garden.
The Chicago Bulls played their first season at the United Center.
The Cleveland Cavaliers played their first season at Gund Arena (now known as Rocket Mortgage FieldHouse).
Due to extensive renovations to the Seattle Center Coliseum (renamed as KeyArena following the season), the Seattle SuperSonics played their home games at the Tacoma Dome, in nearby Tacoma, Washington.
Grant Hill became the first rookie in professional sports to lead fan balloting for the NBA All-Star Game.
The Orlando Magic became the first of the four late 1980s expansion franchises to reach the NBA Finals. They were swept in four games by the defending champion Houston Rockets.
Lenny Wilkens passed Red Auerbach to become the NBA's all-time leader in wins, which stood for 15 years.
Moses Malone, the only remaining active former ABA player, announced his retirement after 19 NBA seasons. Malone, who came to the professional level without any college basketball experience, retired just in time for a new generation of prep-to-pro stars like Kevin Garnett and Kobe Bryant to arrive on the scene.
In an effort to increase scoring, the NBA's competition committee voted to shorten the three-point field goal line to a uniform 22 feet around the basket beginning this season and lasting through the 1996–97 NBA season. Orlando Magic forward Dennis Scott set a then-single season record for most three-pointers made with 267 during the 1995–96 NBA season (Later surpassed by Stephen Curry, who notched 402 three-pointers in the 2015–16 NBA season). The NBA would revert to its original three-point field goal parameters of 23 feet, 9 inches (22 feet at the corners) at the start of the 1997–98 NBA season.
Starting this season, players fouled while in the act of shooting a three-point attempt would get three free throws instead of two.
Hand-checking was eliminated from the end line in the backcourt to the opposite foul line.
The Western Conference Finals series between the San Antonio Spurs and Houston Rockets was notable for the lack of home team success.  The home team lost each of the first 5 games of the series, with the Rockets finally breaking through with a home win in Game 6.
The Miami Heat made two blockbuster trades. The first one was 2 days before the season when Miami traded Rony Seikaly to the Golden State Warriors for Billy Owens and Sasha Danilovic. Then, 2 games into the season after a game against the Phoenix Suns, Miami traded Grant Long, Steve Smith and a 1996 1st round pick to the Atlanta Hawks for Kevin Willis and a 1996 1st round pick. The latter trade was so one-sided (Miami missed the playoffs altogether while Atlanta became a contender in the East) that it was credited with spurring the Heat to make their biggest decision in franchise history: hiring Pat Riley to be their coach and top executive.
In the last game of the regular season for both teams, the Denver Nuggets defeated the Sacramento Kings to obtain the eighth and final playoff spot in the Western Conference. Had the Kings won, they would have qualified instead. They had missed the playoffs for nine straight seasons. As for the Nuggets, this was their final postseason appearance until 2004.
For the first time since the 1971–72 season, the league brought the first wave of third jerseys. The Atlanta Hawks, Charlotte Hornets, Detroit Pistons, Orlando Magic, Phoenix Suns and Sacramento Kings released new alternate uniforms for the season.
The Los Angeles Lakers retired James Worthy's jersey number 42 in December and the Boston Celtics retired the late Reggie Lewis jersey number 35 on their rafters, the last season in which both teams retired a jersey until 2017–18.
On November 5, 1994, the San Antonio Spurs first home of the season, against the Golden State Warriors, was delayed for 50 minutes as the pregame fireworks show triggered a water cannon that sent water blasting down on fans, players and coaches for four minutes before it was shut off.

1994–95 NBA changes
 The Atlanta Hawks added new black alternate uniforms.
 The Charlotte Hornets added new navy and purple alternate uniforms.
 The Chicago Bulls moved into the United Center.
 The Cleveland Cavaliers changed their logo and uniforms, replacing their blue and orange colors with light blue, remained orange and black. They also moved into the Gund Arena.
 The Detroit Pistons added new red alternate uniforms with side panels to their jerseys and shorts.
 The Orlando Magic changed their road uniforms to blue pinstripe jerseys, while their primary black pinstripe uniforms became their alternate jerseys.
 The Philadelphia 76ers changed their uniforms, adding side panels and removing stars to the jerseys and shorts.
 The Phoenix Suns added new black alternate uniforms.
 The Sacramento Kings changed their logo and uniforms, replacing their blue and red colors with purple and black. They also added new half black and half purple alternate uniforms.
 The Seattle SuperSonics moved into the Tacoma Dome for the season, due to renovations at the Seattle Center Coliseum.

Standings

By division

By conference

NOTE: The Detroit Pistons finished the 1994–95 NBA season with a 28–54 win–loss record along with a .341 win percentage, and finished 29 games behind the #1 seed Orlando Magic. The Pistons also posted a 22–19 record at home, a 6–35 record on the road, and an 8–20 record against teams in the Central Division.

Notes
z – Clinched home court advantage for the entire playoffs
c – Clinched home court advantage for the conference playoffs
y – Clinched division title
x – Clinched playoff spot

Playoffs
Teams in bold advanced to the next round. The numbers to the left of each team indicate the team's seeding in its conference, and the numbers to the right indicate the number of games the team won in that round. The division champions are marked by an asterisk. Home court advantage does not necessarily belong to the higher-seeded team, but instead the team with the better regular season record; teams enjoying the home advantage are shown in italics.

Statistics leaders

NBA awards
Most Valuable Player: David Robinson, San Antonio Spurs
Co-Rookies of the Year: Jason Kidd, Dallas Mavericks and Grant Hill, Detroit Pistons 
Defensive Player of the Year: Dikembe Mutombo, Denver Nuggets
Sixth Man of the Year: Anthony Mason, New York Knicks
Most Improved Player: Dana Barros, Philadelphia 76ers
Coach of the Year: Del Harris, Los Angeles Lakers

All-NBA First Team:
F – Karl Malone, Utah Jazz
F – Scottie Pippen, Chicago Bulls
C – David Robinson, San Antonio Spurs
G – John Stockton, Utah Jazz
G – Penny Hardaway, Orlando Magic

All-NBA Second Team:
F – Charles Barkley, Phoenix Suns
F – Shawn Kemp, Seattle SuperSonics
C – Shaquille O'Neal, Orlando Magic
G – Gary Payton, Seattle SuperSonics
G – Mitch Richmond, Sacramento Kings

All-NBA Third Team:
F – Detlef Schrempf, Seattle SuperSonics
F – Dennis Rodman, San Antonio Spurs
C – Hakeem Olajuwon, Houston Rockets
G – Reggie Miller, Indiana Pacers
G – Clyde Drexler, Portland Trail Blazers / Houston Rockets

NBA All-Defensive First Team:
F – Dennis Rodman, San Antonio Spurs
F – Scottie Pippen, Chicago Bulls
C – David Robinson, San Antonio Spurs
G – Gary Payton, Seattle SuperSonics
G – Mookie Blaylock, Atlanta Hawks

NBA All-Defensive Second Team:
F – Derrick McKey, Indiana Pacers
F – Horace Grant, Orlando Magic
C – Dikembe Mutombo, Denver Nuggets
G – Nate McMillan, Seattle SuperSonics
G – John Stockton, Utah Jazz

NBA All-Rookie First Team:
Jason Kidd, Dallas Mavericks
Grant Hill, Detroit Pistons
Eddie Jones, Los Angeles Lakers
Brian Grant, Sacramento Kings
Glenn Robinson, Milwaukee Bucks

All-NBA Rookie Second Team:
Juwan Howard, Washington Bullets
Donyell Marshall, Minnesota Timberwolves
Eric Montross, Boston Celtics
Wesley Person, Phoenix Suns
Jalen Rose, Denver Nuggets
Sharone Wright, Philadelphia 76ers

References

 
     
1994 in American sports
1995 in American sports